John C. Kimball High School (KHS) is an American public comprehensive high school in Tracy, California, south of 11th Street on Lammers Road. Kimball High School is the third comprehensive high school in the Tracy Unified School District. The first day of school was August 12, 2009 with an enrollment of 1,472 students.

School facilities
The school sits on a 55-acre site on the east side of Lammers Road south of 11th Street. It was designed by Urban Ernst Design Group and constructed by F&H Construction. The school has eight single-story classroom buildings, a library, a 400-seat performing arts center, two gymnasiums, a 4,000-seat stadium, a swimming pool and athletic fields.

References

External links
Kimball High School website
KHS athletics

Educational institutions established in 2009
High schools in San Joaquin County, California
Tracy, California
Public high schools in California
2009 establishments in California